Elizabeth Doyle Yeager (born 17 June 2003) is an indoor and field hockey player from the United States, who plays as a midfielder.

Personal life
Elizabeth Yeager was born and raised in Greenwich, Connecticut.

Yeager is a student at Princeton University.

Career

Club hockey
Elizabeth Yeager is a current player for the WC Eagles hockey team.

Indoor
In 2019, Yeager made her first appearance for the United States Indoor team, during a test series against Croatia in Sveti Ivan Zelina. She then went on to represent the team at the Indoor Croatia Cup, where she won a gold medal.

Yeager won her second gold medal with the USA Indoor team in 2021, at the Indoor Pan American Cup in Spring City.

Senior national team
Elizabeth Yeager made her senior debut for the United States in 2021, during the 2020–21 FIH Pro League.

References

External links

2003 births
Living people
American female field hockey players
Female field hockey midfielders
21st-century American women